Francis Bridgeman may refer to:

Francis Bridgeman (married 1673), son of Sir Orlando Bridgeman, 1st Baronet, of Great Lever
Sir Francis Bridgeman, 3rd Baronet (1713–1740), British baronet
Francis Bridgeman (British Army officer) (1846–1917), British Army brigadier-general and MP for Bolton
Francis Bridgeman (Royal Navy officer) (1848–1929), British First Sea Lord

See also
Bridgeman (surname)